The Kickapoo Turnpike is a  toll road in the U.S. state of Oklahoma. The northern section from US-62 to Interstate 44 (Turner Turnpike) opened to traffic on October 13, 2020. The southern segment from Interstate 40 to US-62 opened to traffic on January 5, 2021.

Route description
The turnpike begins just east of Luther Road, at an at-grade intersection with SE 89th Street, on the Oklahoma–Cleveland county line. It heads north and features a southbound-only interchange with I-40 a half-mile later. There are four other interchanges between its termini: SE 29th Street, Reno Avenue, NE 23rd Street (US-62), and Britton Road. A toll plaza is on the turnpike in the vicinity of Hefner Road and NE 122nd Street. The Kickapoo Turnpike ends at a trumpet interchange with I-44 (Turner Turnpike) in Luther, just east of I-44 exit 146 (the Luther/Jones interchange).

History
The turnpike project originally was given the name "Northeast Oklahoma County Loop." The road itself was proposed on October 29, 2015, by Gov. Mary Fallin, as part of the state's Driving Forward initiative. On June 6, 2016, the tollway was approved by the Oklahoma Department of Transportation, under the working title Eastern Oklahoma County Turnpike. In September 2019, "Kickapoo Turnpike" was announced as the tollway's official name.

Construction
The first piece of the turnpike to be constructed is the interchange with I-44, at the northern end of the route. Construction on this interchange began in January 2018, and the entire turnpike is expected to be complete by 2021. Phase 1, which stretches from the Turner Turnpike to US 62 (23rd Street) in Harrah, opened on October 13, 2020. Phase 2, which opened on January 5, 2021, connects the rest of the Turnpike to Interstate 40, linking I-40 directly to Interstate 44 on the eastern side of the Oklahoma City metro. The cost of constructing the Kickapoo Turnpike has been estimated to be more than $440 million (2018 dollars).

Opposition
In January 2016, a group calling itself Citizens Opposed to the Eastern Oklahoma County Loop-Turnpike-Interstate was reported to have created a Facebook page in opposition to the proposed turnpike. Following months of meetings and protests, Neal McCaleb, interim director for the Oklahoma Turnpike Authority (OTA), released a statement saying that, because of public input and the work of engineering professionals, the estimated number of homes that would eventually be lost to construction had been reduced by 22 percent, from 103 houses to 80.

In August 2016, a lawsuit was filed against the OTA, claiming that the agency, in issuing $900 million in bonds to be used for multiple toll road projects, was in violation of the Oklahoma Constitution, which stipulates that laws passed may address only one subject. On December 13, 2016, the Oklahoma Supreme Court ruled in favor of the OTA, stating that the agency had properly authorized the bond issue and given "valid notice of this application."

Future
On August 2, 2021, the Oklahoma Transportation Commission approved the designation of the Kickapoo Turnpike as part of an extension of Interstate 240, forming a beltway around Oklahoma City. ODOT Director Tim Gatz stated in the Transportation Commission meeting that the numbering change was primarily to aid in navigation using digital mapping and routing applications. Gatz also said, "If you look at the Interstate 240 designation on the loop around the Oklahoma City metropolitan area, we are finally to the point where we have a truly contiguous route there that can shoulder the burden of some of that transportation need in a loop format. That's common practice across the country, and you'll see that in many of the metropolitan areas, and that update will really be beneficial as far as everything from signage to how do you describe that route on a green-and-white sign." The designation must be approved by the American Association of State Highway and Transportation Officials (AASHTO) and the Federal Highway Administration (FHWA) to take effect.

A southern extension of the Turnpike to I-35 is planned.

Tolls
On March 1, 2016, toll rates on all turnpikes in Oklahoma increased for the first time since June 2009. The rate hike was implemented to help fund the Driving Forward initiative, which includes improvements and/or extensions to five other Oklahoma toll roads, as well as the construction of the Kickapoo Turnpike from scratch.

, it costs $3.95 with PlatePay ($1.90 with Pikepass) to drive the entire length of the turnpike.

Exit list
Exit numbers branch off of I-44's mileage markers.

References

External links

 Oklahoma Turnpike Authority

Proposed roads in the United States
Toll roads in Oklahoma
Transportation in Oklahoma City
Transportation in Oklahoma County, Oklahoma